Men with Brooms is a Canadian television sitcom, which debuted on CBC Television on October 4, 2010. It is a television adaptation of the 2002 film Men with Brooms, and was filmed in Winnipeg, Manitoba, Canada.

The series stars Brendan Gall, William Vaughan, Joel Keller, Anand Rajaram, Aliyah O'Brien, Glenda Braganza, and Siobhan Murphy. The show's producer, Paul Gross, narrates and makes occasional appearances as Chris Cutter, his character in the original film.

Men with Brooms aired for one season and was not renewed.

Plot
The series is set in the fictional town of Long Bay, Ontario, and focuses on the members of a local curling club. The series was shot at the Fort Rouge Curling Club in Winnipeg.

DVD release
On November 22, 2011, Entertainment One released Men with Brooms- Season 1 on DVD in Region 1.

References

External links

 Men with Brooms
 

CBC Television original programming
2010s Canadian sitcoms
2010 Canadian television series debuts
2011 Canadian television series endings
Television shows filmed in Winnipeg